Jaimerson da Silva Xavier or simply Jaime Xavier (born 26 February 1990) is a Brazilian professional footballer who plays as a centre-back for Indonesian club Persis Solo. He has previously played for Portuguesa and Joinville.

Career
Jaime began his career with Portuguesa, appearing at various youth levels before being promoted into the first-team. He made his debut for the club in the 2010 Campeonato Brasileiro Série D versus Campinense.

In 2016, Jaime completed a permanent move to Figueirense.

Career statistics
.

Honours

Club honors
Persija Jakarta
 Liga 1: 2018
 Indonesia President's Cup: 2018

References

1990 births
Living people
People from Guarulhos
Brazilian footballers
Association football defenders
Primeira Liga players
Campeonato Brasileiro Série A players
Campeonato Brasileiro Série B players
Campeonato Brasileiro Série D players
Liga 1 (Indonesia) players
Associação Portuguesa de Desportos players
Esporte Clube Rio Verde players
Grêmio Esportivo Anápolis players
C.D. Nacional players
Nacional Atlético Clube (SP) players
Figueirense FC players
Joinville Esporte Clube players
Santa Cruz Futebol Clube players
Persija Jakarta players
Madura United F.C. players
Persis Solo players
Brazilian expatriate sportspeople in Indonesia
Expatriate footballers in Indonesia
Brazilian expatriate footballers
Footballers from São Paulo (state)